The Altenalp Türm (2,033 metres) is a peak of the Alpstein massif, located in the canton of Appenzell Innerrhoden, on the ridge between Ebenalp and the Säntis. It is the northernmost peak rising above 2,000 metres in Switzerland.

References

External links
Altenalp Türm on Hikr.org

Mountains of Switzerland
Mountains of the Alps
Mountains of Appenzell Innerrhoden
Appenzell Alps
Two-thousanders of Switzerland